The Richmond–VMI football rivalry is a college football rivalry played between the VMI Keydets and the Richmond Spiders, representing the Virginia Military Institute and University of Richmond, respectively. The series began in 1893, two years after VMI fielded its first football team in 1891, and three years after Richmond's first football team was formed in 1890.

Aside from one year in 1992 in which the game was played in Norfolk, Virginia, the series has always been played at either VMI or Richmond.

History
Founded in 1839 on the site of the Lexington state arsenal, the Virginia Military Institute, the nation's oldest state-supported military college, first began football in 1873 which featured a one-game season, though the first official team was not fielded until 18 years later in 1891. The Keydets play their home games at 10,000-seat Alumni Memorial Field, their home since 1962.

The University of Richmond, a private, nonsectarian university, was founded in 1830 as "Richmond College". The Spiders began playing football in 1890, and won their first national championship in 2008 by defeating Montana 24–7. Richmond plays their home games at 7,800-seat E. Claiborne Robins Stadium.

The series began in 1893, and VMI won the first five contests, all of which were shutouts. The Keydets also won 12 of the first 14 games, though the series has shifted in Richmond's favor in the last few decades, as the Spiders have won 21 of the last 23 games dating back to 1983. In all, 90 games have been played as of 2015, the most games played against a single opponent for VMI. Both schools were members of the Southern Conference for several decades until Richmond became an independent in 1977, where they now play in the Colonial Athletic Association. Richmond currently holds a 12-game winning streak in the series, and VMI has not won since 1996.

Game results

 Source: 2013 VMI Football Fact Book

See also  
 List of NCAA college football rivalry games

References

College football rivalries in the United States
Richmond Spiders football
VMI Keydets football
1893 establishments in Virginia
College sports in Virginia
Sports rivalries in Virginia